Invasins are a class of proteins associated with the penetration of pathogens into host cells.  Invasins play a role in promoting entry during the initial stage of infection.

In 2007, Als3 was identified as a fungal invasion allowing Candida albicans to infect host cells.

References

External links
 

Proteins
Virulence factors